In Cold Blood is the fifth studio album by Florida death metal band Malevolent Creation. It was produced by Scott Burns and released on June 24, 1997 via Pavement Music. Jason Hagan was supposed to play guitar on the album but never did due to him having a falling out with Derek Roddy.

Track listing

Personnel
Jason Blachowicz - Bass/vocals
Phil Fasciana - Rhythm guitar
John Paul Soars - Lead guitar
Derek Roddy - Drums

References

Malevolent Creation albums
1997 albums
Albums produced by Scott Burns (record producer)